Armatobalanus is a genus of crustacean in family Balanidae. It contains at least the following species :
Armatobalanus allium (Darwin, 1854)
Armatobalanus arcuatus Hoek, 1913
Armatobalanus californicus Zullo, 1967
Armatobalanus cepa (Darwin, 1854)
Armatobalanus filigranus (Broch, 1916)
Armatobalanus motuketeketeensis Buckeridge, 1983
Armatobalanus nefrens (Zullo, 1963)
Armatobalanus nuagaonensis Carriol & Mohanti, 1993
Armatobalanus quadrivittatus (Darwin, 1854)
Armatobalanus quinquivittatus (Hoek, 1913)
Armatobalanus terebratus (Darwin, 1854)

References

Archaeobalanidae
Taxonomy articles created by Polbot
Maxillopoda genera